Volodymyrets is an urban-type settlement in Rivne Oblast (province) in western Ukraine. The town was also formerly he administrative center of Volodymyrets Raion (district), housing the district's local administration buildings until the raion's abolition, but is now administered within Varash Raion. Its population is 8,699 as of the 2001 Ukrainian Census. Current population: 

The town is located at the confluence of the Styr and Horyn rivers. Volodymyrets was first founded in ancient Kievan Rus' times, and it acquired the status of an urban-type settlement in 1957.

Famous people from Volodymyrets
 Max Kidruk — Ukrainian writer.
 Lesia Tsurenko — Ukrainian tennis player.

See also
 Rafalivka, the other urban-type settlement in Volodymyrets Raion of Rivne Oblast

References

Urban-type settlements in Varash Raion
Volhynian Voivodeship (1569–1795)
Volhynian Governorate
Wołyń Voivodeship (1921–1939)
Populated places established in the 12th century